The 1979 St Albans City and District Council election took place on 3 May 1979 to elect members of St Albans City and District Council in England. This was on the same day as the 1979 general election and other local elections.

Summary

|}

References

St Albans
St Albans City and District Council elections
1970s in Hertfordshire